Francisco Xavier Stork (né Francisco Xavier Arguelles, born 1953) is a Mexican-American writer. He is best known for his award-winning 2009 book, Marcelo in the Real World.

Personal life 
Francisco  Xavier Arguelles was born in Monterrey, Mexico in 1953 to single mother Ruth Arguelles. Because he was born outside of wedlock, his mother was sent to a convent to birth the child. Although he was supposed to be adopted, his mother decided to keep him. Eventually, his grandfather let both him and his mother to move back to their home city, Tampico.

Stork's mother married Charles "Charlie" Stork, a Dutch man 20 years Arguelles's elder, six years later, and he adopted Francisco. Charlie gave Francisco a typewriter for his seventh birthday, beginning Francisco's love of storytelling.

The Stork family moved to El Paso, Texas when Francisco was nine years old. Francisco attended a grammar school, where he learned English.

Charlie Stork died in a car crash when Francisco was 13.

Stork is a Christian. He is married to Jill  Syverson-Stork and has two children (Nicholas and Anna) and four grandchildren. He lives with his wife outside of Boston.

Education 
At thirteen years old, Stork received a scholarship to the local Jesuit High School. He rose to the top of his class, and eventually received a full-ride scholarship to Spring Hill College, where he studied English Literature and Philosophy. There, he won his first prize in creative writing.

After graduating from Spring Hill College, Stork received a  Danforth  Fellowship, which allowed him to attend Harvard University, where he studied Latin American Literature.

Deciding academia was too distant from the problems people were facing in the world, Stork attended Columbia Law School.

Career 
Stork began his career as an attorney in 1982 and continued until his retirement in 2015. Beginning in 2000, Stork worked at MassHousing, a Massachusetts state agency that finances affordable housing.

After working in the legal field for twenty years, Stork published his first novel.

Publications 

 The Way of the Jaguar (2000)
 Behind the Eyes (2006)
 Marcelo in the Real World (2009)
 The Last Summer of the Death Warriors (2010)
 Irises (2012)
 The Memory of Light (2016)
 On the Hook (2021)

Disappeared series 

 Disappeared (2017)
 Illegal (2020)

Anthology contributions 

 What You Wish For: A Book for Darfur (2012)
 Two and Twenty Dark Tales: Dark Retellings of Mother Goose Rhymes (2012)
 Open Mic: Riffs on Life Between Cultures in Ten Voices, edited by Mitali Perkins (2013)
 Life Inside My Mind: 31 Authors Share Their Personal Struggles, edited by Jessica Burkhart  (2018)
 Unbroken: 13 Stories Starring Disabled Teens, edited by Marieke Nijkamp (2018)
 Ab(solutely) Normal, edited by Nora Shalaway Carpenter and Rockey Callen (2023)

Awards and honors 
Five of Stork's books, plus two audiobooks, are Junior Library Guild selections: On the Hook, Disappeared, The Memory of Light, The Last Summer of the Death Warriors, and Marcelo in the Real World.

Four of his books have been included in lists of the best young adult books of the year. Publishers Weekly included Marcelo in the Real World on their 2009 list and The Last Summer of the Death Warriors on their 2010 list.  Bank Street College of Education named The Last Summer of the Death Warriors one of their Best Books of 2011 for ages 12-14. Kirkus Reviews named The Memory of Light one of the best teen books of 2016 and Disappeared one of the best teen books of 2017. The Chicago Public Library also named Disappeared one of the best young adult books of the year.

References

External links 

 Official website

Living people
Columbia Law School alumni
Harvard University alumni
Spring Hill College alumni
1953 births
People from Monterrey
American writers
American people of Mexican descent
American young adult novelists